A History of Crime – Berlin 1987-1991: An Introduction to Crime & the City Solution is a compilation album by Crime & the City Solution, released on September 24, 2012 through Mute Records.

Track listing

References 

2012 compilation albums
Crime & the City Solution albums
Mute Records compilation albums